Melipotis contorta is a species of moth in the family Erebidae. It is found from Florida, through Mexico and Guatemala to Brazil. It is also found in Cuba, St. Thomas, Hispaniola, Puerto Rico, Martinique, Saint Martin, St. Kitts, Antigua and Barbuda and Jamaica.

Adults are on wing from January to February, in May, July and December in Florida.

References

contorta
Moths of the Caribbean
Moths of Central America
Moths of Cuba
Moths of Guadeloupe
Lepidoptera of Jamaica
Insects of Antigua and Barbuda
Insects of Puerto Rico
Insects of the Dominican Republic
Moths described in 1887